The Terrible Thunderlizards is a segment that aired in the United States as part of Eek! Stravaganza on the Fox Kids programming block, and in Canada on YTV. It aired from November 20, 1993, to July 28, 1997. The series was originally intended as a spin off from Eek! The Cat. The segment was supposed to air at the start of Eek's second season in September 1993, but due to production delays, it began in November. Like Eek!, the segment was also a co-production of Nelvana and Fox Kids in association with Savage Studios Ltd. Dee Snider, from the band Twisted Sister composed the show's theme song.

Ownership of the series passed to Disney in 2001 when Disney acquired Fox Kids Worldwide. The series is not available on Disney+.

Plot
The series chronicled the misadventures of a trio of dinosaur mercenaries released from incarceration after they were falsely accused of helping an enemy Thuggosaur in a time of war when they actually found it injured. They are charged by General Galapagos with the task of eliminating two primitive human beings after scientists realize that if humanity is allowed to multiply it will mean the end of dinosaur supremacy. However, despite their superior size and firepower and the obliviousness of their targets, the mercenaries always fail to kill the humans with comic results. Their usual preferred method of attacking the humans was throwing bombs full of bees, which upon impact would usually then go after the dinosaurs; forcing them to run to water to get away from the bees. Although the mercenaries failed to eliminate the humans, they had better luck in defending Jurassic City from enemies, and had been successful in dangerous missions such as rescuing the kidnapped daughter of the president, which might explain why the team was allowed to continue working and not returned to prison.

Characters

Doc Tari
Doc Tari or "Doc" (voiced by Savage Steve Holland), is the leader of the Thunderlizards team. He is a Parasaurolophus only with a hole in the center of his crest that contains many gadgets such as a buzz-saw and a grappling hook. He is the team's most focused member, but is every bit as unfocused as Kutter and Squatt when not chasing the humans or performing missions. Doc, both in voice and mannerisms is a parody of various Arnold Schwarzenegger film characters such as John Matrix from Commando, Dutch from Predator, and with a bit of the Terminator. His catch phrase is "We move!".

Day Z. Kutter
Day Z. Kutter or "Kutter" (voiced by Bill Kopp), is the second-in-command of the team. He is a Styracosaurus, although he was mis-addressed as a Triceratops. As his name suggests, he is good with knives, being the master of the knife fight, and wears a skull T-shirt. Kutter is smarter than Squatt, but dumber than Doc. He is often shown fooling around with Squatt and requires Doc's quick wit and strength to help them focus.

Bo Diddley Squatt
Bo Diddley Squatt  or "Squatt" (voiced by Jason Priestley in 1994-1996, Corey Feldman in 1996-1997), is the third member of the team and their top sniper. He is an Allosaurus. He is the cliché "dim-witted clumsy screw-up". His voice and mannerisms appear to be similar to Private Hudson, Bill Paxton's character from the film Aliens. Squatt is often used as the volunteer to assess dangerous situations. His catchphrase is "Something tells me that's a bad thing,"  to which Kutter sometimes responds, "Yes Squatt, that would fit nicely in the bad things category!!!".

General Galapagos

General Galapagos (voiced by Kurtwood Smith) is the boss of the Thunderlizards. He is a green bad-tempered Tyrannosaurus with a fat belly and a huge bottom. He wears a Blue General military uniform with a gold starred blue cap. When humans were starting to become a threat, General Galapagos had Doc, Squatt, and Kutter's prison sentenced commuted so that they can deal with the humans. He oversees the missions of the Terrible Thunderlizards to hunt down the humans but is continually frustrated that they never accomplish their mission. He was the one who foresaw that, given the trio's overall performance, their race is doomed.

Dr. Steggy
Dr. Steggy is a Stegosaurus scientist (voiced by Charlie Adler) who works for the Jurassic City Military. He has a nephew called Huckleberry (voiced by Cam Clarke) who befriends the humans, Bill and Scooter.

Mr. T-Rex
Mr. T-Rex is Galapagos's best soldier. He is a Tyrannosaurus who is based on and voiced by Mr. T. Mr. T-Rex is a parody of Mr. T's characters Clubber Lang from Rocky III & B. A. Baracus from The A-Team, even using some of Mr. T's popular catch phrases. His anger frequently gets him into trouble resulting in the Thunderlizards having to save him.

Nate the Dragon
Nate the Dragon (voiced by Nathan Wang) is a Velociraptor who is a stealth and martial arts expert using uses a Bo staff.

El Gordo
El Gordo is an unusually small Ceratosaurus who is an expert in camouflage and can disappear by sticking a plant in his hat.

Bill & Scooter
Bill and Scooter are the two humans - Homo sapiens, called "mankinds" - the Thunderlizards struggle to eliminate so they will never evolve into the humans of today. Both Bill and Scooter wear animal skins (blue for Bill and red for Scooter) somewhat like the ones worn by male characters in The Flintstones, but only covering their right shoulders, and walk in animal skin shoes. While both are aware that the Thunderlizards are trying to kill them, they have no idea why or the anti-human prejudice from Dinosaur City. In a few episodes the pair befriend some dinosaurs.

Bill (voiced by Charles Adler) is tall and thin with red hair and is Scooter's ill-tempered partner. He is often used to test drive Scooter's devices often with chaotic, disastrous and painful consequences. Throughout the series, he uses the catch phrase "When does the hurting stop?", usually after one of Scooter's failed and painful experiments. Bill is continually depressed, sometimes almost to the point of psychosis. He has a love/hate relationship with Scooter often trying kill him after suffering some painful mishap from one of Scooter's inventions. Bill is the target of choice for a particular species jungle slug that regularly tries to eat him, though he has targeted Scooter on one occasion, as well.

Scooter (voiced by Curtis Armstrong) is short, fat and bald with a yellow beard. He is a jolly, overly enthusiastic caveman and inventor and is blissfully unaware of Bill's ill-tempered attitude toward him. He is an eternal optimist seeking world peace and harmony and rarely panics unless being pursued by the Thunderlizards.  His inventions often fail and result in disastrous consequences where Bill is usually the victim. However, sometimes his inventions save him and Bill from being hurt by the Thunderlizards or other dangers in the jungle.

Babs
Babs is the first female human and was created by dinosaur scientists using recovered genetic material from Bill and Scooter spliced together, then doubling the X-chromosome to create a female. Her name comes from the acronym for Bio-engineered Animated Biped Specimen (BABS) and she believes strongly in "womankind". The Thunderlizards' goal was to use Babs to entrap the two men for the dinosaurs, but she is more intelligent than them and abandoned her original mission to live alone in the jungle. Babs is aloof and manipulative and was initially repulsed by Scooter and preferred the company of Bill who was easier to manipulate. Babs make future appearances where she has ideas as how to use Bill and Scooter to further her aspirations.

The Thuggosaurs
The Thuggosaurs are a race of undead Grim Reaper-like dinosaurs that live in the X-Zone on the outskirts of Jurassic City which is a frequent target of the Thuggosaurs who are recurring antagonists in the program. The Thuggosaurs are a parody of the hooded, mutant survivors living in the Forbidden Zone from the movies "Beneath the Planet of the Apes" and prequel "Battle for the Planet of the Apes" in their targeting of Ape City. Thuggo (voiced by Brad Garrett in most appearances, understudied by Kurtwood Smith in four episodes) is the diabolical leader of a group of black-hooded skeleton-like Thuggosaurs. He is a Megalosaurus. His vanity insists he always look good, so Thuggo often spends more time trying to improve his appearance than accomplishing his evil plans - plans that would mean the end of the Living Dinosaurs once carried out. The Thuggosaurs sometimes have conspiracies that initially appear effective against the dinosaurs, such as kidnapping the president's daughter. Biff is Thuggo's wimpy, flower-loving, second-in-command and is inappropriate to be part of a villainous organization like The Thuggosaurs. Thuggo has an roundish skull-shape with sharp teeth-like bones while Biff has a long snout with bucky teeth and wears a pair of goggles. All other Thuggosaurs share similar features.

The Primates
The primates are a group of simians who co-exist in the X-Zone like Bill and Scooter whom they regard as backward and primitive. They are more advanced than the humans, living in condominiums and with an advanced social structure.

Episodes

Cast
Savage Steve Holland .... Doc (36 Episodes) & Additional Voices
Bill Kopp .... Kutter (36 Episodes) & Additional Voices
Jason Priestley .... Squatt (I, 1993–1996) (30 Episodes)
Corey Feldman .... Squatt (II, 1996–1997) (6 Episodes)
Charlie Adler .... Bill (36 Episodes) & Additional Voices
Curtis Armstrong .... Scooter (36 Episodes) & Additional Voices
Kurtwood Smith .... General Galapagos (35 Episodes) & Thuggo (understudy for 4 Episodes)
Mr. T .... Mr. T-Rex (3 Episodes)
Brad Garrett .... Thuggo (26 Episodes)
Cam Clarke .... Huckleberry (2 Episodes) & Additional Voices
Elizabeth Daily .... The President's Daughter (1 Episode)

References

1990s American animated television series
1990s Canadian animated television series
1993 American television series debuts
1997 American television series endings
1993 Canadian television series debuts
1997 Canadian television series endings
American animated television spin-offs
American children's animated fantasy television series
Animated television series about dinosaurs
Canadian animated television spin-offs
Canadian children's animated fantasy television series
English-language television shows
Fox Broadcasting Company original programming
Fox Kids
Television series by 20th Century Fox Television
Television series by Fox Television Animation
Television series by Nelvana
Television series by Saban Entertainment
Television series created by Savage Steve Holland
YTV (Canadian TV channel) original programming